Clemenger may refer to:

 Clemenger Contemporary Art Award
 Clemenger Group, holding company of a group of companies involved in advertising and marketing communications services throughout Australia and New Zealand